Pass is a townland in County Meath on the border between Meath and County Louth in Ireland.

Townlands of County Meath